Lonneke Slöetjes (born 15 November 1990) is a Dutch volleyball player, who plays as an opposite spiker. She is a member of the Women's National Team. She plays as of 2015 for VakifBank Istanbul.

Career
Slöetjes started playing at VC Varsseveld. In 2015, she played with the national team at the 2015 European Games in Baku, Azerbaijan. During the 2016 Olympic Games, Slöetjes helped the Netherlands reach their first semifinal, finishing fourth and being chosen as Best Opposite Spiker of the tournament. She won the Best Opposite Spiker award in the 2016 FIVB World Grand Prix.

Slöetjes won the 2016–17 CEV Champions League gold medal with VakıfBank Istanbul when her team defeated the Italian Imoco Volley Conegliano 3-0 and she was also awarded Best Opposite Spiker.

Awards

Individuals
2015 Montreux Volley Masters "Best Opposite Spiker"
2015 European Championship "Best Opposite Spiker"
2016 Europe Olympic Qualification Tournament "Best Opposite Spiker"
2015-16 Turkish Women's Volleyball League "Best Opposite Spiker"
2016 World Olympic Qualification Tournament "Best Opposite Spiker"
2016 FIVB World Grand Prix "Best Opposite Spiker"
2016 Olympic Games "Best Opposite Spiker"
2016-17 CEV Champions League "Best Opposite Spiker"
2017 European Championship "Best Opposite Spiker"

Clubs
 2015-16 CEV Champions League -  Runner-Up, with Vakıfbank
 2016–17 CEV Champions League -  Champion, with VakıfBank
 2017–18 CEV Champions League -  Champion, with VakıfBank
 2015–16 Turkish League -  Champion, with VakıfBank
 2017–18 Turkish League -  Champion, with VakıfBank
 2018–19 Turkish League -  Champion, with VakıfBank
 2016 Club World Championship -  Bronze medal, with VakıfBank
 2017 Club World Championship -  Champion, with VakıfBank
 2018 Club World Championship -  Champion, with VakıfBank
 2017 Turkish Super Cup -  Champion, with VakıfBank

References

External links
Highlight movie
FIVB Profile

1990 births
Living people
Dutch women's volleyball players
Dutch expatriate sportspeople in Germany
Dutch expatriate sportspeople in Italy
Dutch expatriate sportspeople in Turkey
Expatriate volleyball players in Germany
Expatriate volleyball players in Italy
Expatriate volleyball players in Turkey
Volleyball players at the 2015 European Games
European Games competitors for the Netherlands
People from Oude IJsselstreek
Volleyball players at the 2016 Summer Olympics
VakıfBank S.K. volleyballers
Opposite hitters
Olympic volleyball players of the Netherlands
Sportspeople from Gelderland
21st-century Dutch women